Thomas Foley (19 July 1778 – 11 January 1822) was the eldest son of Hon. Andrew Foley.  He lived near Newent, Gloucestershire.

He represented Droitwich from 1805 to 1807; then Herefordshire in Parliament from 1807 until 1818; and then Droitwich again from 1819 until his death.  He died unmarried.

References

External links 
 

1778 births
1822 deaths
People from Newent
Members of the Parliament of the United Kingdom for English constituencies
UK MPs 1802–1806
UK MPs 1806–1807
UK MPs 1807–1812
UK MPs 1812–1818
UK MPs 1818–1820
UK MPs 1820–1826
Whig (British political party) MPs for English constituencies
Thomas